In dated or non-theoretical grammatical terminology, a subject complement is a predicative expression that follows a linking verb (copula) and that complements the subject of a clause by either renaming or describing it. It completes the meaning of the subject. In the former case, a renaming noun phrase such as a noun or pronoun is called a predicative nominal. An adjective following the copula and describing the subject is called a predicative adjective. In either case the predicative complement in effect mirrors the subject. Subject complements are used with a small class of verbs called linking verbs or copulas, of which be is the most common. Since linking verbs are intransitive, subject complements are not affected by any action of the verb. Subject complements are typically neither clause arguments nor adjuncts. A predicative complement can be either a subject complement or an object complement.

A subject complement does not determine the verb. When there is a difference between the number, the verb agrees with the subject.

Examples
The subject complement is bold in the following examples:

The lake was a tranquil pool. – Predicative nominal as subject complement

Here, was is a linking verb (an inflected form of be) that equates the subject complement phrase a tranquil pool, with the head noun, pool, to the subject, the lake (with head noun lake).

The lake is tranquil. – Predicative adjective as subject complement

In this example tranquil is a predicative adjective linked through the verb is (another inflected form of be) to the subject the lake.

An example in which the subject complement is a dependent clause is:

That is what my point is. – Predicative clause as subject complement

Other languages
Some languages do not use predicative adjectives with a linking verb; instead, adjectives can become stative verbs that replace the copula.

Disputed pronoun forms
Eighteenth-century grammarians such as Joseph Priestley justified the colloquial usage of it is me (and it is him, he is taller than him, etc.) on the grounds that good writers use it often:
All our grammarians say, that the nominative cases of pronouns ought to follow the verb substantive as well as precede it; yet any familiar forms of speech and the example of some of our best writers would lead us to make a contrary rule; or, at least, would leave us at liberty to adopt which we liked best.

Other grammarians, including Baker (1770), Campbell (1776), and Lindley Murray (1795), say the first person pronoun must be I rather than me because it is a nominative that is equivalent to the subject. The opinions of these three partisans of the nominative case were accepted by the schoolmasters. However, modern grammarians such as Rodney Huddleston and Geoffrey K. Pullum deny that such a rule exists in English and claim that such opinions "confuse correctness with formality".

This argument for it is I is based on the model of Latin, where the complement of the finite copula is always in the nominative case (and where, unlike English, nominative and accusative are distinguished morphologically in all nominal parts of speech and not just in pronouns). The situation in English may, however, also be compared with that of French, where the historical accusative form moi functions as a so-called disjunctive pronoun, and appears as a subject complement (c'est moi, 'it is me'). Similarly, the clitic accusative form can serve as a subject complement as well as a direct object (il l'est 'he is [that/it]', cf. il l'aime 'he loves it').

Fiction writers have occasionally pointed out the colloquialisms of their characters in an authorial comment. In "The Curse of the Golden Cross", for example, G. K. Chesterton writes, "'He may be me,' said Father Brown, with cheerful contempt for grammar." And in The Lion, the Witch and the Wardrobe, C. S. Lewis writes, "'Come out, Mrs. Beaver. Come out, Sons and Daughters of Adam. It's all right! It isn't Her!' This was bad grammar of course, but that is how beavers talk when they are excited."

References 

English usage controversies
Modern English personal pronouns